The 1967–68 Mitropa Cup was the 28th season of the Mitropa football club tournament. It was contested by sixteen clubs from 15 European cities and 5 countries. Winner was Red Star Belgrade of Yugoslavia who beat Spartak Trnava of Czechoslovakia in the two-legged final 4–2 on aggregate.

Teams of the 1967–68 Mitropa Cup

Bracket

Final

1st leg

2nd leg

See also
1967–68 European Cup
1967–68 European Cup Winners' Cup
1967–68 Inter-Cities Fairs Cup
1968 Intertoto Cup
1967–68 Balkans Cup

Notes

References

External links
1967–68 Mitropa Cup at Rec.Sport.Soccer Statistics Foundation
Crvena zvezda
Spartak Trnava

1967-68
1967–68 in European football
1967–68 in Hungarian football
1967–68 in Yugoslav football
1967–68 in Austrian football
1967–68 in Czechoslovak football
1967–68 in Italian football